Péter Szilágyi (born 26 January 1988 in Debrecen) is a Hungarian football player who currently plays for ESMTK.

References

External links
Péter Szilágyi at Soccerway

1988 births
Living people
Sportspeople from Debrecen
Hungarian footballers
Association football forwards
Debreceni VSC players
Vasas SC players
Lombard-Pápa TFC footballers
Nyíregyháza Spartacus FC players
Békéscsaba 1912 Előre footballers
Soroksár SC players
Ceglédi VSE footballers
BFC Siófok players
Nemzeti Bajnokság I players
Nemzeti Bajnokság II players